Reverend James Smith may refer to:
James Smith, character in the Chinua Achebe novel Things Fall Apart
James Smith (archbishop of St. Andrews and Edinburgh) (1841–1928), Roman Catholic archbishop in Scotland
James Smith (archdeacon of Barnstaple) (died 1667), Archdeacon of Barnstaple
James Smith (Vicar Apostolic of the Northern District) (1645–1711), English Roman Catholic vicar-apostolic

See also
James Smith (disambiguation)